The 1943 All-Pacific Coast football team consists of American football players chosen by various organizations for All-Pacific Coast teams for the 1943 college football season.  The organizations selecting teams in 1943 included the Associated Press (AP) and the United Press (UP).

The USC Trojans won the Pacific Coast Conference (PCC) championship with an 8-2 record and had three players named to the first team by either the AP or UP: quarterback Mickey McCardle (AP, UP), end Ralph Heywood (AP, UP), and center Bill Gray (AP, UP).

The Washington Huskies finished with a 4-1 record, were ranked #12 in the final AP Poll and placed four players on the first team: backs Sam Robinson (UP) and Pete Susick (AP), end Jack Tracy (AP, UP), and guard Bill Ward (AP, UP).

Five players from teams outside the PCC received first-team honors. Four of them played for the Pacific Tigers football team coached by Amos Alonzo Stagg: fullback John Podesto (AP, UP), tackles Art McCaffray (AP, UP) and Earl Klapstein (UP), and guard Bart Gianelli (AP, UP).  The fifth was College Football Hall of Fame back Herman Wedemeyer (UP) of the St. Mary's Gaels.

All-Pacific Coast selections

Quarterback
 Mickey McCardle, USC (AP-1; UP-1)

Halfbacks
 Sam Robinson, Washington (UP-1)
 Herman Wedemeyer, St.Mary's (UP-1) (College Football Hall of Fame)
 Art Honegger, California (AP-1)
 Pete Susick, Washington (AP-1)

Fullback
 John Podesto, Pacific (AP-1; UP-1)

Ends
 Ralph Heywood, USC (AP-1; UP-1)
 Jack Tracy, Washington (AP-1; UP-1)

Tackles
 Art McCaffray, Pacific (AP-1; UP-1)
 Earl Klapstein, Pacific (UP-1)
 Don Malmbertg, UCLA (AP-1)

Guards
 Bill Ward, Washington (AP-1; UP-1)
 Bart Gianelli, Pacific (AP-1; UP-1)

Centers
 Bill Gray, USC (AP-1; UP-1)

Key

AP = Associated Press

UP = United Press

Bold = Consensus first-team selection of both the AP and UP

See also
1943 College Football All-America Team

References

All-Pacific Coast Football Team
All-Pacific Coast football teams
All-Pac-12 Conference football teams